Bansatar Kheda is a census town in Damoh district in the state of Madhya Pradesh, India.

Demographics
 India census, Bansatar Kheda had a population of 5,032. Males constitute 53% of the population and females 47%. Bansatar Kheda has an average literacy rate of 66%, higher than the national average of 59.5%; with 61% of the males and 39% of females literate. 16% of the population is under 6 years of age.

References

Damoh